Andrey Shary (born June 17, 1965) is a Russian journalist, historical author and media manager. 
He studied journalism at the State Institute of International Relations in Moscow, graduating in 1987. Shary worked for the Soviet daily Pravda in 1987–1990, then moving to the weekly Rossiya (1990–1994). Since 1992 he collaborates with Radio Svoboda, the Russian Service of U.S. granted Radio Free Europe/Radio Liberty, Inc. In 1994-1996 he worked as a field-reporter and commentator in former Yugoslavia, based in Zagreb. Since 1996 he is a senior broadcaster, since 2016 Director for Radio Free Europe / Radio Liberty's Russian Service and an author of 15 books on the Yugoslav wars, history of Balkans, Central Europe, modern popular culture, and travel journals. Shary has written numerous articles and commentaries. He lives in Prague.

Books
 After the Rain Falls. Yugoslavian Myths: Between the Old and the New Age. NLO, Moscow, 2002, 
 The Tribunal. Chronicles Of The Unfinished War. Human Rights Publishers, 2003, 
 A Prayer for Serbia. The Secret of Zoran Djindjic’s Death. Human Rights Publishers, 2004,  Co-author: Aja Kuge.
 Four Seasons. NLO, Moscow, 2006, 
 Sign 007: On Her Majesty’s Secret Service. NLO, Moscow, 2007,  Co-author: Natalya Golitsyna.
 Sign F: Fantomas in Books and on the Screen. NLO, Moscow, 2007, 
 Sign W: Leader of the Red Skins in Books and on the Screen. NLO, Moscow, 2008, 
 Sign Z: Zorro in Books and on the Screen. NLO, Moscow, 2008, 
 Sign D: Dracula in Books and on the Screen. NLO, Moscow, 2009,  Co-author: Vladimir Vedrashko.
 Sign 007: James Bond in Books and on the Screen. NLO, Moscow, 2010,  Co-author: Natalya Golitsyna.
 The Roots and the Crown. Essays on Austria-Hungary: A Destiny of an Empire. KoLibri, Moscow, 2011,  Co-author: Yaroslav Shimov.
 Austria-Hungary. A Destiny of an Empire. KoLibri, Moscow, 2015,  Co-author: Yaroslav Shimov. 2nd edition.
 The Globe of Saint Petersburg. NLO, Moscow, 2011, 
 The Globe of Moscow. NLO, Moscow. 2013,  Co-author: Olga Podkolzina. 
 Danube. An Imperial River. KoLibri, Moscow, 2015,  
 Dunărea. Fluviul imperrilor. Polirom, Iași, 2017 
 Коріння та корона. Нариси про Австро-Угорщину: доля імперії. Dipa, Kyiv, 2018 
 Balkans. Borderlines of the Empires. KoLibri, Moscow, 2018,  
 Дунай: ріка iмперій. Dipa, Kyiv, 2021 
 Bohemian Times. Big History of a Small Country: from Saint Wenceslas to Vaclav Havel. Photos by Olga Bazhenova. KoLibri, Moscow, 2022,

References

External links

 Radio Free Europe / Radio Liberty. Russian Service

1965 births
Living people
People from Belogorsk, Amur Oblast
Russian journalists
Russian writers